"Nisam ista"/"Things Are Going My Way" is the debut maxi single released by the winner of Idol Serbia, Montenegro & Macedonia, Cveta Majtanović. It features the Idol winning song Nisam Ista plus the English version - "Things Are Going My Way". The lyrics of the songs Snežana Vukomanović.

Track listing
"Nisam ista"
"Things Are Going My Way"
"Hot Stuff"
"Stop!"

See also
Cveta Majtanović
Idol Serbia, Montenegro & Macedonia

2005 singles
2004 songs